Daddy Long Legs (1931) is an American pre-Code film directed by Alfred Santell and starring Janet Gaynor and Warner Baxter. The story involves an orphan who is taken under the wing of a wealthy benefactor.

The original story, written in 1912 by Jean Webster, compared the childhood of the wealthy to that of orphanage children. Although suffering under a tough matron, Judy Abbott (Janet Gaynor) manages to cope and help the other orphans through intelligence and hard work, and the wealthy Jervis Pendleton (Warner Baxter), who is the benefactor, can't help admiring his young charge. Yet, she doesn't know it's he who is sponsoring her schooling, even when they meet, through Jervis' niece, who is Judy's roommate, and the girl, who was once alone, has to choose between their growing affection and a younger suitor.

Cast
Janet Gaynor as  Judy Abbott
Warner Baxter as  Jervis Pendleton
Una Merkel as Sally McBride
John Arledge as Jimmy McBride
Claude Gillingwater as Riggs 
Effie Ellsler as Mrs. Semple
Kendall McComas as Freddie Perkins
Kathlyn Williams as Mrs. Pendleton
Elizabeth Patterson as Mrs. Lippett, the matron
Louise Closser Hale as Miss Pritchard
Sheila Bromley as Gloria 
Billy Barty as Orphan 
Edith Fellows as  Orphan 
Clarence Geldart as Minister at Commencement 
Edwin Maxwell as Wykoff 
Steve Pendleton as Sally's Beau

Production
Janet Gaynor had won the first Academy Award for Best Actress in 1928 and Warner Baxter had won the second Academy Award for Best Actor for his portrayal of the Cisco Kid in In Old Arizona by the time Daddy Long Legs was released. The screenplay was based on the stage play Daddy Long-Legs by Jean Webster.

Fox made French and Italian dubbed versions of the film and successfully sued a Dutch company for making a film based on the same material.

References

1931 romantic comedy films
1931 films
Fox Film films
American black-and-white films
Films directed by Alfred Santell
Films about orphans
Films with screenplays by Sonya Levien
American romantic comedy films
1930s English-language films
1930s American films
Silent romantic comedy films